Leistogenes is a genus of moth in the family Gelechiidae. It contains the species Leistogenes rebellis, which is found in Peru.

The wingspan is about 45 mm. The forewings are brownish-ochreous with a broad costal stripe of whitish suffusion from the base, becoming obsolete towards the apex. There is a blackish dot towards the costa near the base. The stigmata form cloudy spots of ferruginous-brown suffusion, the plical slightly before the first discal. The hindwings are pale greyish with an apical blotch of ochreous-whitish suffusion.

References

Pexicopiini